AS-5, As 5 or AS.5 may refer to:

 Airspeed AS.5 Courier, a British light aircraft of the 1930s
 Argus As 5, a German aircraft engine
 AS-5 Kelt, NATO reporting name of Soviet KSR-2 rocket
 , a United States Navy submarine tender